Matthew Hagerty McBride (born May 23, 1985) is an American former professional baseball first baseman and catcher. He played in Major League Baseball (MLB) for the Colorado Rockies and Oakland Athletics.

McBride was drafted by the Cleveland Indians in the second round of the 2006 MLB draft. He made his MLB debut with the Colorado Rockies in 2012, with whom he played right field and first base. McBride's MLB career statistics included outfield games played, 22; first base games, 18; and games caught, 16. His MLB batting line was at .201/.228/.299, with 4 home runs (HR), and 19 runs batted in (RBI).

Career

Cleveland Indians
McBride attended Liberty High School in Bethlehem, Pennsylvania, and was drafted by the Cleveland Indians in the second round (75th overall) of the 2006 MLB draft out of Lehigh University. Although he was drafted as a catcher, he has also spent considerable time at first base and in the outfield.

He made his professional debut playing for the Class A-Short Season Mahoning Valley Scrappers of the New York–Penn League in 2006. By 2011, he had made his way to Triple-A with the International League's Columbus Clippers.

Colorado Rockies

In July 2011, he was traded from Cleveland to the Colorado Rockies with Drew Pomeranz, Alex White, and Joe Gardner for Ubaldo Jiménez. With the Rockies, he was assigned to the Triple-A Colorado Springs Sky Sox.

On August 4, 2012, he made his MLB debut with the Rockies. In four at bats, he recorded two hits (including a double), one RBI, and a run scored. He mostly split the 2013 to 2015 seasons between Triple-A and the Rockies. In 2015 with the Rockies, in 42 at bats he hit .167/.186/.167.

Oakland Athletics
He was granted free agency in October 2015, and signed a minor league contract with the Oakland Athletics in December 2015. He was assigned to the Nashville Sounds (Triple-A), where he began the 2016 season. The Athletics called him up to the MLB on April 27, and for the season he batted .209/.227/.279 as he caught 11% (1 of 9) of attempted base-stealers. He was sent outright to Triple-A after the 2016 season, and elected to become a free agent.

He re-signed a minor league contract with the A's in November 2016. On June 7, 2017, McBride caught a combined no-hitter with Sounds batterymates Chris Smith, Sean Doolittle, Tucker Healy, and Simón Castro. He elected free agency on November 6, 2017.

Philadelphia Phillies
On January 3, 2018, McBride signed a minor league contract that included an invitation to spring training with the Philadelphia Phillies.

In 2018 with the Lehigh Valley IronPigs in AAA he batted .242/.333/.479 in 190 at bats. On November 2, 2018, he elected free agency. On December 21, 2018, McBride re-signed with the Phillies to a minor league contract.

In 2019, he played with the IronPigs he batted .225/.272/.444 with 9 home runs and 28 RBIs in 151 at bats, as he played 25 games at first base, 9 at catcher, 2 in right field, and one as a pitcher. He became a free agent following the 2019 season.

McBride chose to retire from professional baseball in early 2020 and began a career in financial planning.

Achievements
McBride garnered the following achievements in his minor league career:    
 Arizona Fall League All-Prospect Team (2009, 2010)
 New York–Penn League Mid-Season All-Star (2006)    
 Pacific Coast League Mid-Season All-Star (2012, 2015)    
 Pacific Coast League Post-Season All-Star (2012)  
 South Atlantic League Mid-Season All-Star (2007)
 Topps Eastern League Player of the Month (2010)

References

External links

1985 births
Living people
Akron Aeros players
Albuquerque Isotopes players
Baseball players from Pennsylvania
Colorado Rockies players
Colorado Springs Sky Sox players
Columbus Clippers players
Gigantes del Cibao players
Grand Junction Rockies players
Gulf Coast Indians players
Kinston Indians players
Lake County Captains players
Lehigh Mountain Hawks baseball players
Lehigh Valley IronPigs players
Liberty High School (Bethlehem, Pennsylvania) alumni
Mahoning Valley Scrappers players
Major League Baseball catchers
Major League Baseball first basemen
Major League Baseball left fielders
Major League Baseball right fielders
Nashville Sounds players
North Shore Honu players
Oakland Athletics players
Peoria Saguaros players
Sportspeople from Bethlehem, Pennsylvania
Toros del Este players
American expatriate baseball players in the Dominican Republic
Tulsa Drillers players
United States national baseball team players
Mat-Su Miners players